Henry Ries (September 22, 1917 – May 24, 2004) was a photographer who worked for New York Times. His most famous photo was of "The Berlin Air Lift" which was later made into a U.S. Postage Stamp commemorative.

Ries was born in Berlin and grew up in Germany, but sensed the impending doom of Hitler's political style and, as a Jew, emigrated to the United States in 1937.  Immigration officials in New York sent him back to the Third Reich because of technical problems with his papers.  Ries was permitted to enter America in January 1938, having crossed the Atlantic twice to do so.

When America entered World War II, Ries immediately joined the army and fought in the Asian Theater, humorously pointing out that he served in Asia due to his "good German" skills.  He was stationed in India with an aerial reconnaissance unit.  After the war, in August 1945, Ries, still a soldier, returned to Berlin.  He soon resigned from the army in order to work for the OMGUS Observer as a photojournalist. Two years later, he begin to work for The New York Times as a European photographer, photographing many of the scenes of destroyed post-war Germany including the destruction and Berlin blockade which have become iconic images.  In 1951, Ries returned to the US and eventually turned to commercial photography.  In 1955, he opened his own studio in Manhattan.

When he returned to Berlin in 1945, he pronounced the city forever changed.  In his book, Abschied meiner Generation, he said, "Seeing all this devastation and desperation, confronted with hunger and fear, cripples and black-marketers – and with no Nazi in sight anywhere – I realized how fundamentally the seven years between emigration and occupation had changed Germany's exterior and my own interior."

During his time with the Times, he met and photographed the famous and the infamous, such as artists Pablo Picasso and Pablo Casals, as well as Spanish General Francisco Franco.

In 2003 he was awarded Germany's Officer Cross of the Order of Merit, the highest award for citizens of other countries.

References

External links 
 A gallery of photos by Henry Ries of the Berlin Blockade at the German History Museum

1917 births
2004 deaths
20th-century American photographers
United States Army personnel of World War II
Officers Crosses of the Order of Merit of the Federal Republic of Germany
Jewish emigrants from Nazi Germany to the United States
Burials at the Waldfriedhof Zehlendorf